Notable people who live in Brasília include:

Contributors to the foundation of Brasília

José Bonifácio - First Brazilian chancellor to suggest the idea of building a capital in the interior of Brazil, away from the chaotic life of its predecessor, Rio.
Don Bosco - Priest
Juscelino Kubitschek - President and Founder
Oscar Niemeyer - Architect
Lúcio Costa - Urban planner

Famous alumni at the University of Brasília

Darcy Ribeiro, anthropologist, founder. 
Oscar Niemeyer, architect, Pritzker Prize 1988, founder. 
Athos Bulcão, artist, founder. 
Cyro dos Anjos, writer. 
Cláudio Santoro, composer and violinist. 
Afonso Arinos de Melo Franco, diplomat and poet. 
Nelson Pereira dos Santos, cineast.

Athletes
Endrick Felipe, Football Player (current Sociedade Esportiva Palmeiras )
Kaká, footballer (retired)
Lúcio, footballer (retired)
Amoroso, footballer (retired)
Marílson Gomes dos Santos, professional athlete, winner of the New York City Marathon (2006)
Hudson de Souza, middle distance runner
Joaquim Cruz, middle distance runner, won the gold medal in the 800m at the 1984 Summer Olympics and the silver medal in the same competition at the 1988 Summer Olympics
Oscar Schmidt, Basketball Legend
Leila Barros, Volleyball player, won two bronze medals at the 1996 Summer Olympics and at 2000 Summer Olympics
Paula Pequeno, Volleyball player, won the gold medal and was the MVP of the 2008 Summer Olympics
Leandro Macedo, Triathlon
Mariana Ohata, Triathlon
Tatiana Lemos, Swimmer
Rebeca Gusmão, Swimmer
Nelson Piquet, Racecar pilot. Born in Rio de Janeiro, but lived in Brasília in his childhood and started his racing career
Nelsinho Piquet Jr., Racecar pilot
Felipe Nasr, Racecar pilot
Rodrigo Medeiros, Jiu Jitsu World Champion
Paulo Thiago, MMA fighter
Rani Yahya, MMA fighter
Ketleyn Quadros, judoka, won the bronze medal at 2008 Summer Olympics

Professionals
Ana Paula Padrão - Journalist,
Poliana Abritta - Journalist

Politicians
Cristovam Buarque - Renowned Brazilian Intellectual, former Dean of the University of Brasília, Brazilian Congressman, former governor of the Federal District, candidate for the Brazilian presidential campaign of 2006, and current Brazilian Senator.

Artists
Rainer Cadete - actor
Ney Matogrosso - Singer
Oswaldo Montenegro - singer
Cássia Eller - singer
Zélia Duncan - Singer and former lead singer from Os Mutantes 
Patrícia Pillar - actress
Murilo Rosa - actor

List
Brasilia
Brasília-related lists